Milen Tonev (born 8 June 1988 in Lukovit) is a Bulgarian footballer who currently plays for Botev Lukovit as a forward.

References

External links
 

Bulgarian footballers
1988 births
Living people
First Professional Football League (Bulgaria) players
Association football forwards
PFC Vidima-Rakovski Sevlievo players